The Independent Greens – Denmark's New Left-Wing Party, or simply the Independent Greens (Q), is a left-wing political party in Denmark. It was founded 7 September 2020 by four former members of The Alternative: Sikandar Siddique, Uffe Elbæk, and Susanne Zimmer, who were members of the Danish parliament, and Niko Grünfeld, member of Copenhagen City Council. The party leader is Sikandar Siddique. Elbæk was founder and leader of The Alternative from 2013 to 2020.

The Independent Greens describe themselves as left wing and a "responsible, climate-conscious and anti-racist party".

History 
Sikandar Siddique, Uffe Elbæk, Susanne Zimmer, and Niko Grünfeld left The Alternative following allegations that new leader Josephine Fock had harassed members of the party. Three weeks after her election on 1 February, Dagbladet Information published the allegations from anonymous sources. Fock narrowly survived a motion of no confidence by The Alternative's executive board following the allegations in March 2020, after which Elbæk was handed an ultimatum by his constituency's local party branch to back Fock or have his support withdrawn. Elbæk chose to leave the party on 7 March, followed by Siddique, Zimmer and Rasmus Nordqvist; Grünfeld had already left the party on 28 February. Nordqvist subsequently joined the Socialist People's Party, while Fock would resign as leader of The Alternative on 14 November.

Ahead of the 2022 Danish general election, The Alternative's new leader Franciska Rosenkilde offered the Independent Greens and Vegan Party a chance to form a united list to increase the chances of green representation in the Folketing, as all three parties were polling below the threshold. Siddique dismissed the plan. Elbæk later called for the Independent Greens and Alternative to merge, and eventually rejoined the old party, reducing the number of sitting FG MPs to two.

In the election, the Independent Greens received 0.9% of the vote, falling below the 2% threshold to retain their seats in the Folketing. They were the second-smallest registered party in terms of vote share, ahead of only the Christian Democrats.

Election results

Parliament

References

External links 
 Official website (in Danish)

2020 establishments in Denmark
Green political parties in Denmark
Political parties established in 2020